Mathura Das Mathur Hospital is the one of the largest hospitals in Jodhpur city, Rajasthan, India. This hospital is run by the state government.

History
The foundation stone of this hospital was laid in 1974 by the then Chief Minister Shri Harideo Joshi, and was inaugurated in 1979 with a capacity of 200 beds, which stands presently at 493 beds. The departments working in this hospital are Cardiology, Neurosurgery, Radiotherapy, Urology, Ophthalmology, Dermatology, ENT, Orthopedics, Radiology, and Forensic Medicine. This hospital also has a trauma center.

See also
Healthcare in India

References

Hospital buildings completed in 1979
Hospitals established in 1979
Buildings and structures in Jodhpur
Hospitals in Rajasthan
1979 establishments in Rajasthan
20th-century architecture in India